The rufous-tailed flycatcher (Myiarchus validus) is a species of bird in the family Tyrannidae.
It is found in Jamaica.
Its natural habitats are subtropical or tropical moist lowland forests, subtropical or tropical moist montane forests, and heavily degraded former forest.

References

External links
 
 

rufous-tailed flycatcher
Endemic birds of Jamaica
rufous-tailed flycatcher
Taxonomy articles created by Polbot